Andrea Eskau (born 21 March 1971) is a German handbiker, Paralympic biathlon, and cross country skier who was born in Apolda and was a winner of three gold medals in Summer Paralympic games. In 2014, she became a recipient of another gold medal at the 2014 Winter Paralympics in Sochi, Russia. In 2013, she was a cross-country sit skiing winner at the IPC Nordic Skiing World Championship. Eskau also competed at the 2016 Paralympic games in Rio de Janeiro winning a gold medal in the H5 Cycling road race and taking home a bronze medal in the H4-5 time trial. In 2018, Eskau went on to compete at her third Winter Paralympmics and won gold in both the 10 km and 12.5 km sitting biathlon.

She became a paraplegic in 1998 when she crashed her bike on the way to school. The accident resulted in many vertebra being broken, this left her without the use of her legs and therefore a wheelchair user.

References

Further reading
 Eskau möchte Gold on kicker

External links
 
 
 

1971 births
Living people
German female biathletes
German female cross-country skiers
German female cyclists
Paralympic gold medalists for Germany
Paralympic bronze medalists for Germany
Paralympic silver medalists for Germany
Biathletes at the 2010 Winter Paralympics
Biathletes at the 2014 Winter Paralympics
Medalists at the 2010 Winter Paralympics
Medalists at the 2014 Winter Paralympics
Medalists at the 2008 Summer Paralympics
Medalists at the 2012 Summer Paralympics
Medalists at the 2016 Summer Paralympics
Cyclists at the 2008 Summer Paralympics
Cyclists at the 2012 Summer Paralympics
Cyclists at the 2016 Summer Paralympics
People from Apolda
Biathletes at the 2018 Winter Paralympics
Paralympic biathletes of Germany
Paralympic cyclists of Germany
Cross-country skiers at the 2018 Winter Paralympics
Paralympic cross-country skiers of Germany
Medalists at the 2018 Winter Paralympics
Paralympic medalists in cross-country skiing
Paralympic medalists in biathlon
Paralympic medalists in cycling
Sportspeople from Thuringia
Cyclists from Thuringia
People from Bezirk Erfurt
21st-century German women